James David Brewster (January 9, 1902 – August 20, 1998) was an American Football League player for the Newark Bears. He played collegiately for the Georgia Tech football team. His fancy footwork earned him the nickname "the Side-Stepping Wonder."

Early years
Jimmy Brewster was born in Newnan, Georgia, on January 9, 1902. His father was the Coweta County Sheriff, and his mother, Margaret, was a homemaker.

References

1902 births
1998 deaths
People from Newnan, Georgia
Sportspeople from the Atlanta metropolitan area
Players of American football from Georgia (U.S. state)
American football quarterbacks
Georgia Tech Yellow Jackets football players
Newark Bears (AFL) players